Salarabad may refer to:
Salarabad, East Azerbaijan
Salarabad, Hamadan
Salarabad, Kerman
Salarabad, Kuzaran, Kermanshah Province
Salarabad, Miyan Darband, Kermanshah Province
Salarabad, Razavar, Kermanshah Province
Salarabad, Sonqor, Kermanshah Province
Salarabad, Khuzestan
Salarabad-e Chenar, Kohgiluyeh and Boyer-Ahmad Province
Salarabad, Kurdistan
Salarabad, Razavi Khorasan
Salarabad, Tehran
Salarabad, Zanjan
Salarabad-e Nadar, Lorestan Province